"Hechizos, pócimas y brujería" (lit: Spells, potions and witchcraft) is the twelfth album by the Spanish folk metal band Mägo de Oz. After the controversial retirement of their last vocalist José Andrëa, this is the first album  of Zeta as the band's vocalist.

Track list

Bonus tracks
These tracks were available only in iTunes

Personnel
Txus Di Fellatio – drums
Zeta – lead vocal
Patricia Tapia – vocals in "Brujas" and chorus
Carlos Prieto "Mohammed" – violin
Frank – rhythm guitar
Carlitos – lead guitar
Javi Diez – keyboards
Fernando Mainer – bass
Josema – flutes

References

2012 albums
Mägo de Oz albums